Balanophora japonica (Japanese:ツチトリモチ; Chinese:日本蛇菰) is a plant species in the genus Balanophora found in Japan.

Balanophonin is a neo-lignan that can be found in B. japonica. It also contains ellagitannins, lignan glycosides, caffeoyl, coumaroyl, galloyl, hexahydroxydiphenoyl glucoses and the hydrolyzable tannins balanophotannin D, E, F and G that contain an oxidized hexahydroxydiphenoyl (HHDP) group.

References

External links
 www.efloras.org

japonica
Plants described in 1902
Flora of Japan